Amazing  is a 2013 sports action drama film directed by Sherwood Hu. The film is a co production between China and the United States, and stars Huang Xiaoming, Amber Kuo, Kim Ah-joong and NBA players Carmelo Anthony, Scottie Pippen and Dwight Howard.

It premiered at the Shanghai International Film Festival in June 2013 and released in China on September 30, 2013.

Plot
Set in modern-day Shanghai, various unexpected events unfold when China's top programmer (Huang Xiao Ming) designs the world's first thought-controlled virtual reality basketball game, and finds himself at risk with the law. The film is also about the passion of sports, love and inspiration.

Cast
 Huang Xiaoming as Bing Shan 
 Amber Kuo as Venus
 Carmelo Anthony as himself
 Scottie Pippen as himself
 Dwight Howard as himself 
 Eric Mabius as Frank Miller
 Kim Ah-joong as Eileen 
 Huang Yi as a cheerleader
 Stephen Fung as Pepper 
 Blackie Chen as Blackie 
 Li Qin as Xiao Ke
 Yi Jianlian as himself
 Wang Zhizhi as himself

Production
Shanghai Film Group approached the NBA with the idea for a film centered on basketball and video games. The production company sent director Sherwood Hu to New York to make the sales pitch. NBA officials were enthused about the idea and arranged for Anthony, Howard and Pippen to participate. Filming began in fall of 2010 in Shanghai with the scenes with the NBA players, who were available only for a few days each because of training schedules. production was halted for half a year while Hu polished the script and waited for some of his other actors to finish other films. Shooting resumed the following spring and wrapped in October 2011. Language was a key issue during the production because of the cast that included actors from the United States, China, South Korea, Taiwan and Hong Kong.

Music
Amazing features musical performances by the China National Symphony Orchestra and lead soprano Ying Huang. The original score was composed by Frank Fitzpatrick.

References

External links
 

Chinese science fiction drama films
2010s science fiction drama films
Chinese basketball films
2013 drama films
2013 films